Harvest Time may refer to:
 Harvest Time (film), a 2004 Russian drama film
 Harvest Time (Elonkorjuu album), 1972.
 Harvest Time (Chisato Moritaka album), 1999